Eric David Hargan (born June 3, 1968) is an American lawyer and government official who served as United States Deputy Secretary of Health and Human Services from October 2017 to January 2021. A member of the Republican Party, Hargan previously acted in this role in 2007 under the George W. Bush administration.

On October 10, 2017, President Donald Trump appointed Hargan as acting United States Secretary of Health and Human Services, which he held until January 29, 2018, when Alex Azar assumed the office.

Early life and education
Hargan was born in 1968 in Cape Girardeau, Missouri and raised in Mounds, Illinois. He received his BA in philosophy from Harvard University and his JD from Columbia Law School, where he was a senior editor of the Columbia Law Review.

Career

From 1997 to 2003, Hargan was a partner in the Chicago headquarters of the law firm of Winston & Strawn, where he specialized in corporate law, particularly mergers and acquisitions, securities, and venture capital transactions.

From 2003 to 2005, Hargan served as Deputy General Counsel of HHS for the George W. Bush administration. From 2005 to 2007, he served the Department as Principal Associate Deputy Secretary and Acting Deputy Secretary. Working closely with Secretary Mike Leavitt, Hargan oversaw the department's operations. He also served as the Regulatory Policy Officer for HHS, overseeing the development and approval of all HHS regulations and significant guidances.

Hargan left the government in 2007 and joined the health law department of law firm McDermott Will & Emery. Hargan joined the health and FDA business development practice of law firm Greenberg Traurig in June 2010.

In 2014, Hargan worked on Illinois Governor Bruce Rauner's health care transition team.

Following the election of Donald Trump, Hargan was on the administration's HHS transition team. On March 15, 2017, Hargan was nominated to be the United States Deputy Secretary of Health and Human Services. His confirmation hearing was held on June 7, 2017. Hargan was confirmed by the U.S. Senate on October 4, 2017.

Personal life
Hargan lives in Virginia with his wife Emily, and their two sons. Hargan served as a professor at Loyola University Chicago School of Law, teaching healthcare regulations and administrative law.

References

External links

HHS Biography in 2007

|-

|-

1968 births
21st-century American lawyers
American civil servants
Columbia Law School alumni
George W. Bush administration personnel
Harvard University alumni
Illinois Republicans
Living people
People from Pulaski County, Illinois
Trump administration cabinet members
Trump administration personnel
United States Deputy Secretaries of Health and Human Services
People associated with Winston & Strawn